The Primetime Emmy Award for Production Design for a Narrative Contemporary Program (One Hour or More) is an award handed out annually at the Creative Arts Emmy Awards.

In 2014, the category was created alongside Primetime Emmy Award for Outstanding Production Design for a Narrative Program (Half-Hour or Less) and Primetime Emmy Award for Outstanding Production Design for a Narrative Period or Fantasy Program (One Hour or More). From 2014 to 2017, contemporary and fantasy programs competed together. Fantasy programs compete alongside period programs since 2018.

Winners and nominations

2010s
Production Design for a Narrative Contemporary or Fantasy Program (One Hour or More)

Production Design for a Narrative Contemporary Program (One Hour or More)

2020s

Programs with multiple wins
4 wins
 The Handmaid's Tale

Programs with multiple nominations
Totals combined with Outstanding Art Direction for a Single-Camera Series.

6 nominations
 The Handmaid's Tale
 True Blood

4 nominations
 Ozark

3 nominations
 House of Cards

2 nominations
 American Horror Story
 The Flight Attendant
 Justified
 Killing Eve
 Succession
 Twin Peaks

References

Art Direction for a Contemporary or Fantasy Series (Single-Camera)